Τrypanosoma equiperdum is a species of kinetoplastid parasites that causes Dourine or covering sickness in horses and other animals in the family equidae. T. equiperdum is the only trypanosome that is not spread by an insect vector. There has been substantial controversy surrounding whether T. equiperdum should be considered a unique species, or a strain of T. evansi or T. brucei.  T. equiperdum is unique in that its kinetoplast, the network of connected rings that make up its mitochondrial DNA, consists of thousands of "minicircles" that are identical in sequence.

References

External links

Parasites of equines
Parasitic excavates
Trypanosomatida

ja:媾疫トリパノソーマ